Duinefontein 1 and 2 are early prehistoric archaeological sites near Cape Town in South Africa

They have produced Acheulean stone tools and animal bones dating between 200,000 and 400,000 years ago. It was not a settlement site, but instead seems to have been a waterside location where animals could be hunted or scavenged when they died by hominids. The hominids used the tools to butcher the animals, although many of the animal bones from the site represent killings by other carnivores.

One context, from Duinefontein 2, dated by optically stimulated luminescence dating to 270,000 BP contained ochre that must have been introduced to the site by people and which may have been used as body adornment. If so, it would represent some of the earliest evidence of an aesthetic sensibility in early peoples.

Sources
 Cruz-Uribe, K et al., 2003, Excavation of buried late Acheulean (mid-Quaternary) land surfaces at Duinefontein 2, West Cape Province, South Africa, Journal of Archaeological Science 30, 559–75, qtd in Scarre, C (ed.) (2005). The Human Past, London: Thames and Hudson. .

Archaeological sites in South Africa
Pleistocene
Archaeological sites of Southern Africa